Ali Omar may refer to:
 Ali Omar (footballer)
 Ali Omar (judoka)